The Conflict of the Ages is a book series written by American religious author Ellen G. White (1827-1915).

The books follow the Biblical history of the world, with special focus on the conflict between Christ and Satan. The series starts with the pre-creation rebellion of Satan in Heaven, then moves on to the creation of the earth, the fall of Adam and Eve into sin, the Old Testament, the birth and ministry of Jesus until His ascension, then the early Christian church, the Dark Ages, the Protestant reformation, the last days of earth's history, the second coming of Christ, the millennium, and the destruction of sin and finally the recreation of earth and God's kingdom with man for eternity. This progression explains in detail the Seventh-day Adventist (SDA) understanding of the conflict between Christ and Satan and their understanding of the Bible and much of world history. Mrs. White wrote the books based on her research of other authors and special information which she claimed to receive through visions from God. The books thus include unique insights and concepts not found in other works of the time.

Books

Patriarchs and Prophets (1890)
Volume 1 covers from the rebellion of Satan in heaven to King David.

Prophets and Kings (1917) 
Volume 2 covers events from King Solomon to Malachi.

The Desire of Ages (1898)

Volume 3 covers the life and ministry of Jesus.

Acts of the Apostles (1911)
Volume 4 covers from the Great Commission to John the Revelator on Patmos.

The Great Controversy (1911)

Volume 5 covers the 70 A.D. destruction of Jerusalem, through Church History, to the end of sin and the recreation of the earth.

Contemporary adaptations 
Adaptations of the 5-volume Conflict of the Ages series have been produced, aimed towards updating the language yet keeping the meaning intact.

 Messiah is an adaptation of The Desire of Ages, by Jerry D. Thomas. Pacific Press; publisher's page

A complete series aimed at younger readers has been commissioned by the General Conference to complement the Cornerstone Sabbath School lessons in 2007–2011:

 The Beginning of the End, an adaptation of Patriarchs and Prophets. Pacific Press; publisher's page
  Royalty and Ruin, an adaptation of Prophets and Kings. Pacific Press; publisher's page
 Humble Hero, an adaptation of The Desire of Ages. Pacific Press; publisher's page
 Unlikely Leaders, from The Acts of the Apostles. Pacific Press; publisher's page

See also
 Steps to Christ another popular book by E. G. White 
 Teachings of Ellen White
 Ellen G. White bibliography
 Inspiration of Ellen White
 Seventh-day Adventist eschatology

References

External links 
 Online versions from the Ellen G. White Estate website
 Connecting with Jesus resources from the church in North America. These include free audio downloads of contemporary adaptations of the Conflict series

Books by Ellen G. White
1858 books
Seventh-day Adventist theology
Seventh-day Adventist media